Epiphanis cornutus is a species of false click beetle in the family Eucnemidae.

References

Further reading

External links

 
 

Elateroidea
Beetles described in 1829